"Today" is a 1964 folk song that was a hit for The New Christy Minstrels. Written by the group's founder, Randy Sparks, it was introduced in the American comedy-Western film Advance to the Rear (1964) and released on the album titled Today.

History
Randy Sparks founded the American large-ensemble folk-music group The New Christy Minstrels in 1961, during popular music's folk revival. The band recorded two Top 40 radio hits in 1963, Green, Green and "Saturday Night", but creative tensions within the organization led to Sparks' decision to leave. On the verge of exiting the group, whose name he would sell to its managers, Sparks

The final song on The New Christy Minstrels' May 1964 Columbia Records album Today, the title track was released as the single Columbia 43000 with the B side "Miss Katy Cruel". The record peaked at No. 17 on the Billboard magazine "Hot 100" chart and No. 4 on the magazine's Adult Contemporary chart.

Production
Vocalists on the original release of "Today" include New Christy Minstrels members Barry McGuire, later to issue the solo hit "Eve of Destruction", and Gene Clark, who would go on to co-found the rock band The Byrds.

Critical analysis
AllMusic reviewer William Ruhlmann called it a "lovely folkish ballad", while AllMusic's Bruce Eder, reviewing the album, found the song "achingly beautiful."

References

External links
"Today" (single) at Discogs. Retrieved May 11, 2020. Archived from the original on May 11, 2020.
Today (album) at Discogs. Retrieved May 11, 2020. Archived from the original on May 11, 2020.

1964 singles
1964 songs
Columbia Records singles
American folk rock songs
Songs written for films
1960s ballads
Folk ballads